Lone Oak (also Browns Chapel or Top of the Mountain) is an unincorporated community and census-designated place (CDP) in southern Sequatchie County, Tennessee, United States. It lies along U.S. Route 127 south of the city of Dunlap, the county seat of Sequatchie County. As of the 2010 census, its population was 1,206.

Lone Oak is part of the Chattanooga, TN–GA Metropolitan Statistical Area.

Demographics

2020 census

As of the 2020 United States census, there were 1,198 people, 423 households, and 336 families residing in the CDP.

References

Census-designated places in Sequatchie County, Tennessee
Unincorporated communities in Tennessee
Chattanooga metropolitan area
Census-designated places in Tennessee
Unincorporated communities in Sequatchie County, Tennessee